Bertuğ Özgür Yıldırım (born 12 January 2002), is a Turkish professional footballer who plays as a forward for Antalyaspor.

Professional career
Yıldırım is a youth product of Sarıyer, and began his senior career with them in the TFF Second League in 2018. He transferred to Hatayspor on 3 June 2021. He made his professional debut with Hatayspor in a 1–1 Süper Lig tie with Kasımpaşa on 14 August 2021.

International career
Yıldırım is a youth international for Turkey, having played for the Turkey U21s, and then with the Turkey U23s at the 2021 Islamic Solidarity Games.

Honours
Turkey U23
Islamic Solidarity Games: 2021

References

External links
 
 

2002 births
Living people
Footballers from Istanbul
Turkish footballers
Sarıyer S.K. footballers
Hatayspor footballers
Süper Lig players
TFF Second League players
Association football forwards